Christian Jungersen (born 10 July 1962 in Copenhagen) is a Danish novelist whose works have been translated into 20 languages. He has published three novels in Danish – Krat (1999), Undtagelsen (2004, published in English as The Exception in 2006), and Du Forsvinder (2012, published as You Disappear in 2014).

Background and education 
Jungersen earned a master's in communication and social science from Roskilde University. Before publishing his first novel, he taught film at Folkeuniversitetet, an open university in Copenhagen. He also worked as an advertising copywriter, a manuscript consultant, and a TV screenwriter. Since 2005, he has divided his time among the US, Ireland, Denmark, and Malta.

Krat 
Krat [Undergrowth] depicts the intense relationship between two men over the course of nearly 70 years. While they begin as bosom buddies in an upper-class suburb of Copenhagen during the 1920s, they end as retirees who, despite not having spoken in decades, remain just as consumed with each other – but now as mortal enemies.

Krat was on the Danish bestseller list for three months when it came out in 1999. It won Bogforum's Debutant Prize and was nominated for Weekendavisen’s literary prize. When the Danish Arts Foundation awarded Jungersen a three-year fellowship in 2000, it was the first time in 20 years that the foundation had given the honor to a debut novelist.

The Exception
A psychological thriller, The Exception ("Undtagelsen") is told in turn by four women who work for the dysfunctional Danish Center for Genocide Information. When two of them receive death threats, it is unclear whether the threats have been sent by an exposed war criminal or a coworker. Drawing on recent work on the nature of evil, the book makes the case that the same dark impulses that lead to genocide may underlie the bullying that plagues the center's office – and be present in all human beings.

The novel was on the bestseller list for a year and a half in Denmark, where it won the P2 Novel Prize and De Gyldne Laurbær. In 2009, readers of Denmark's largest newspaper, Jyllands-Posten, voted The Exception the second best Danish novel of the past 25 years,Vor tids danske roman and in 2010 it won another readers' poll, for the best Danish novel of the preceding decade.

The Exception has been published in 18 countries, and has also been adapted for Radio 4. It was nominated for the International Dublin Literary Award, as well as being shortlisted for the Duncan Lawrie Dagger in the United Kingdom, the Grand Prix des Lectrices de Elle in France, and the Martin Beck Award in Sweden. In the US, both The New York Times and Amazon designated the novel as an editor's choice.

You Disappear 
Jungersen's latest novel, You Disappear ("Du Forsvinder"), is narrated by Mia, whose husband Frederik undergoes radical personality changes due to a slowly growing brain tumor that leaves his intellect, speech, and motor control intact. Their lives change even more when it comes out that, in the year before his diagnosis, he embezzled 12 million kroner from the private Copenhagen school where he is headmaster. But was the tumor already determining his actions at the time, absolving him, or should he go to jail?

In preparing Frederik's defense, Mia immerses herself in the latest brain research, the emerging neurological portrait of human nature, and the classic metaphysical question of free will. Her reading profoundly affects how she responds to Frederik – and to her own passionate impulses.

You Disappear has been both a critical and a commercial success in Denmark since being published there in March 2012. Library and newspaper readers awarded it the Læsernes Bogpris, and it was nominated for two other major honors, Politiken'''s Literature Prize and the Martha Prize. It received five-star reviews in Politiken, Ekstrabladet, MetroXpress, Femina, Magasinet IN, Nordjydske Tidende, and Dagbladenes Bureau. It remained on Denmark's top-10 list of bestselling fiction for an entire year and was the second-bestselling novel in 2012, outsold only by Marco Effekten [The Marco Effect], the Jussi Adler-Olsen thriller.You Disappear has been sold to another ten countries, including Germany and France. The US edition came out in January 2014 from Nan A. Talese/Doubleday. The American translation by Misha Hoekstra won the Leif & Inger Sjöberg Prize from the American-Scandinavian Foundation.

 Film adaptations 
The film Du Forsvinder, based on You Disappear, was directed by Peter Schønau Fog from the screenplay by Peter Schønau Fog and starred Trine Dyrholm and Nikolaj Lie Kaas. The movie premiered in 2017 and was one of the best-selling films in Denmark that year. Du Forsvinder was Denmark's submission for the 2017 Oscar for Best Foreign Language Film.

The movie Undtagelsen was based on Jungersen's second novel, The Exception. It was directed by Jesper W. Nielsen from the screenplay by Christian Torpe. Sidse Babett Knudsen, Amanda Collin, Danica Curcic, and Lene Maria Christensen played the leading roles. It came out when Danish cinemas reopened in July 2020, after having been closed for four months due to the COVID-19 pandemic, and it remained on the country's top-10 list of best-selling films for nine weeks. Under the title The Exception, it won the Valhalla Award for Best Nordic Film at the Santa Barbara International Film Festival in 2020.

 The Gyldendal Anniversary Collection 
To mark its sestercentennial in 2020, the publishing house Gyldendal polled 40,000 readers on which ten books to include in its 250th anniversary collection, Gyldendals Jubilæumskollektion. Just three of the winning books were written by living authors, including Jungersen's Undtagelsen [The Exception''], as well as books by Kim Leine and Carsten Jensen. The collection also includes classics by Karen Blixen and Tove Ditlevsen.

References

External links
 
 Review of The Exception in The New Yorker
 Review of The Exception in The New York Times
 Review of The Exception in The Economist

Danish male writers
Living people
Danish crime fiction writers
1962 births
People from Copenhagen